The Last Desperate Hours is a 1974 Italian poliziottesco (Italian crime genre) Mafia film directed by Giorgio Stegani.

Plot

Cast 
 Antonio Sabàto: Paolo Mancuso
Silvia Monti: Laura Monachesi
Pier Paolo Capponi: Police Commissioner
Nicoletta Rizzi: Lidia Mancuso
Toni Ucci: Ugo Merenda 
Peter Carsten: Maraschi

Production
The film was shot on location in Milan and in Incir-De Paolis Studios in Rome.

Release
The Last Desperate Hours was released in Italy on November 29, 1974 where it was distributed by the Overseas Film Company. It grossed a total of 560.728 million Italian lire on its release.

Reception
In his book Italian Crime Filmography 1968-1980, Roberto Curti noted that "the sociological ambitions end up in excruciating banalities, such as the confrontation between Mancuso and his poor but honest wife (Nicoletta Rizzi)"

The score by Gianni Marchetti was re-used partially in the films Emanuelle's Revenge by Joe D'Amato and SS Girls by Bruno Mattei.

See also
 List of Italian films of 1974

Notes

References

External links

1974 films
Poliziotteschi films
1974 crime films
Films set in Milan
1970s Italian films